Stefano Peschiera  (born 16 January 1995) is a Peruvian competitive sailor.

College 
He won the ICSA Men's Singlehanded National Championship twice, in 2015 and 2018, the ICSA Coed Dinghy National Championship in 2018, and the ICSA Team Racing National Championship in 2017-18 sailing for the College of Charleston, and was named ICSA College Sailor of the Year in 2018.

Olympic Games 
He competed at the 2016 Summer Olympics in Rio de Janeiro, in the men's Laser class, after getting Peru the first out of the 9 berths offered at the Laser World Championship in Kingston, Canada. He is currently Ranked number 8 in the World Sailing Rankings and is already qualified to which will be his second Olympic Games in 2020 Summer Olympics in Tokyo. He has already qualified Peru for the Tokyo 2020 Olympics.

References

External links

1995 births
Living people
Peruvian male sailors (sport)
College of Charleston Cougars sailors
Olympic sailors of Peru
Sailors at the 2016 Summer Olympics – Laser
Sailors at the 2015 Pan American Games
Pan American Games competitors for Peru
Sailors at the 2020 Summer Olympics – Laser
21st-century Peruvian people